List of rivers in Rio Grande do Norte (Brazilian State).

The list is arranged by drainage basin from east to west, with respective tributaries indented under each larger stream's name and ordered from downstream to upstream. All rivers in Rio Grande do Norte drain to the Atlantic Ocean.

By Drainage Basin 

 Guaju River
 Cunaú River
 Curimataú River
 Calabouço River
 Catu River
 Jacu River (Japi River)
 Trairi River
 Baldum River
 Cajupiranga River
 Canto River
 Pitimbu River
 Potengi River (Potenji River, Rio Grande do Norte)
 Jundiaí River
 Doce River
 Ceará-Mirim River
 Maxaranguape River
 Punaú River
 Piranhas River (Açu River)
 Salgado River (Amargoso River)
 Pataxós River
 Paraú River
 Bodó River
 Seridó River
 Sabugi River
 Acauã River
 Currais Novos River
 Espinharas River
 Dos Cavalos River (also a Piranhas River distributary)
 Umbuzerio River
 Apodi River
 Do Carmo River
 Upanema River
 Umari River

Alphabetically 

 Acauã River	
 Apodi River
 Baldum River	
 Bodó River
 Cajupiranga River	
 Calabouço River
 Canto River
 Do Carmo River
 Catu River
 Dos Cavalos River
 Ceará-Mirim River	
 Cunaú River	
 Curimataú River	
 Currais Novos River
 Doce River
 Espinharas River	
 Guaju River	
 Jacu River (Japi River)
 Jundiaí River	
 Maxaranguape River	
 Paraú River	
 Pataxós River	
 Piranhas River (Açu River)
 Pitimbu River	
 Potengi River (Potenji River, Rio Grande do Norte)	
 Punaú River	
 Sabugi River	
 Salgado River (Amargoso River)	
 Seridó River
 Trairi River
 Umari River
 Umbuzerio River	
 Upanema River

References
 Map from Ministry of Transport
  GEOnet Names Server

 
Rio Grande de Norte
Environment of Rio Grande do Norte